Beerware is a tongue-in-cheek term for software released under a very relaxed license (beerware licensed software). It provides the end user with the right to use a particular program (or do anything else with the source code).

Description
Should the user of the product meet the author and consider the software useful, they are encouraged to either buy the author a beer "in return" or drink one themselves. The Fedora project and Humanitarian-FOSS project at Trinity College recognized the "version 42" beerware license variant as 
extremely permissive "copyright only" license, and consider it as GPL compatible.  the Free Software Foundation does not mention this license explicitly, but its list of licenses contains an entry for informal licenses, which are listed as free, non-copyleft, and GPL-compatible. However, the FSF recommends the use of more detailed licenses over informal ones.

Many variations on the beerware model have been created. Poul-Henning Kamp's beerware license is simple and short, in contrast to the GPL, which he has described as a "joke". The full text of Kamp's license is:

 /*
  * ----------------------------------------------------------------------------
  * "THE BEER-WARE LICENSE" (Revision 42):
  * <phk@FreeBSD.ORG> wrote this file.  As long as you retain this notice you
  * can do whatever you want with this stuff. If we meet some day, and you think
  * this stuff is worth it, you can buy me a beer in return.   Poul-Henning Kamp
  * ----------------------------------------------------------------------------
  */

See also
 
Anti-copyright license
Careware
Comparison of free and open-source software licenses
Donationware
WTFPL

References

Free and open-source software licenses
Permissive software licenses
Software licenses